Advancement Via Individual Determination (AVID) is a non-profit organization that provides professional learning for educators to close opportunity gaps and improve college and career readiness for middle and high school, especially those traditionally underrepresented in higher education. AVID's College and Career Readiness System had its start at the secondary level, with elective classes and work in elementary schools and college campuses.

AVID Center 
AVID Center is a course that school districts and college campuses can contract with to provide learning, curriculum, and support services. Districts and campuses decide which parts of the AVID College and Career Readiness System will best serve their needs. AVID Center has offices in San Diego and Dallas.

History 
AVID was founded by Mary Catherine Swanson in 1980, at Clairemont High School, in San Diego, US. The first elective class had 32 students. AVID now serves more than 2 million students in more than 7,500 schools in 47 US states and 16 countries.

Research 

Since 1980, AVID has been closely studied by numerous research teams and individuals.

References

External links 
Official website
Blog site
Ed.gov
Tacoma Univ
UT San Diego

United States educational programs
Public education in the United States